The Three X Sisters were an American all-girl harmony singing trio initially known as The Hamilton Sisters and Fordyce. They were on stage singing together in New York City, on Broadway, as early as 1922 and formed their trio in 1924, which was composed of Pearl Santos (née Hamilton) and Violet Hamilton from Cumberland, Maryland, and Jessie Fordyce from Brooklyn, New York. They were known on NBC radio as "radio's foremost harmony trio."

History and career
Pearl and Violet's family had been in Cumberland for nearly a century, by the early 1910s. Their European heritage settling from Pennsylvania, Ohio, and New York. Part of their Creek people ancestry, in the Maryland area, was in the Allegheny Mountains area for a very long time. Pearl and Vi had individually sung in Cumberland, Maryland, theaters and won prizes for their song competition accomplishments. The Hamilton Sisters found their harmony singing blend in Cumberland. Jessie performed alongside Arthur Yule, her father. The Yule family immigrated from Scotland. Jessie grew up partly in Brooklyn, NY, and on vaudeville stages in the United States. She was on the Brooklyn, New York, vaudeville circuit and beyond; as a young child star, "Baby Helen", her stepping-stone success through songs and vocal imitations had impressed the masses. They were all fairly well known in their theater venues by 1914.

Pearl Hamilton began her career on Broadway as early as 1917. Her roommate during this era was Joan Page, another 'Stars of the Future' entertainer/singer. The average salary in 1919 was $22.00 per week for the All Jazz Revue "chorus girls." Pearl started out as a soft shoe (ballet style) and high-kick dancer, and received positive dance reviews. The Hamiltons began their professional singing careers in harmony at the Haymarket Theatre in Chicago, Illinois. Pearl watched a live performance of the Original Dixieland Jass Band in the Coney Island, New York scene, after her arrival to Broadway stages. Which was an early New York music inspiration. Some walk-on or cameo parts in silent films with Paramount Pictures showed their dancing talents. On December 30, 1920, at the Star Theater in New York City, Pearl's musicianship and piano styles were paired alongside a jazz band which included the Morette Sisters who were  duet singers they played the violin and trombone, and Stanely played the coronet. Violet had been chosen in 1926 by Paramount, exclusively, for a scene of her Charleston dance moves. Later references to this accompanied their radio singing career. In 1920, Pearl and Violet (Hamiltons), were also part of the vocal chorus. A later addition was friend Jessie (Yule) Fordyce with the 'All Jazz Revue' showcase.
Pearl and Violet started entertaining with the 'All Jazz Review', their first known performance, sponsored by Irons & Clamage and the Swear Club (a women's club) was reviewed by The Billboard on January 10, 1920. Pearl, "a tall, willowy girl, Is a dancing wonder" as her artistry in dance had become well known.

The trio started out on Broadway and in vaudeville, with Helen Kane Schroeder, the original Boop-boop-a-Doop Girl. The trio did various song and dance acts, eventually settling for close harmony, which was associated with three-part harmony singing. The Hamilton Sisters and Fordyce earliest known performance together (as a trio team) was at B.F. Keiths Theater in Syracuse, New York, on May 13, 1923. In 1924, they also toured in vaudeville, with Helen Schroeder and Anna Mae Wong. Pearl's harmony trio had the musicianship of the Raymond Fagan Orchestra (a band with no known recordings); a band compared to Paul Whiteman or the Vincent Lopez Orchestras. Pearl Hamilton met Ed Santos, who played trumpet with Fagan's band, and a year later they married in Rochester, New York. During early July 1925, the Hamilton Sisters and Jessie Fordyce were singing at the Eighty-First Street Theatre. In 1926, the trio toured with another popular all-girl act, Jerry and her Baby Grands, appearing together at the Palace Theater in New York. They also toured together in Canada.

1927
The Hamilton Sisters and Fordyce gained enough success to tour abroad. After they departed from the "Stars of the Future" entertainment showcase in the spring of 1927, their management, fronted by Ed Wolfe, had them tour Europe and the United Kingdom. They departed by airplane at a Long Island airport with the American portion of New York's Savoy Orpheans musical unit during the week of May 23, 1927.

In the UK, they met up with American songwriters Richard Rodgers and Lorenz Hart. They also spent time in the recording studio with Bert Ambrose, a British bandleader, musical director Caroll Gibbons, and violinist/director Reg Batton. They toured with the New York engagement and appeared on London and Manchester stages. Played the London Palladium, Alhambra Theatre of Variety, and Plaza. Made a big splash in the theater production Blue Skies.

On October 27, 1927, Harry Plunket Greene, Irish baritone tenor, wrote of the trio after an England performance: "The Hamilton Sisters & Fordyce are just A1 as they are. I wouldn't interfere with them for anything. It's just perfect in its way. I do trust they leave things alone, not try to change."

That November, the trio teamed up with Billy Mayerl, pianist, to do close harmonizing on "Who You, That's Who?", and "Zulu Wail". Their first on-air radio broadcasts were in England on the BBC. The trios' first return to America; departed England on December 10 for Paris. They sailed from Cherbourg, France (New York, Passenger Lists) on the U.S.S. Leviathan on Dec. 15, 1927 for New York City. Reports also show a two year radio contract signed with the BBC, tours with the Savoy Havana Band to European clubs in Paris, Vienna, Berlin, Monte Carlo, and at the 'Kit Kat Club' in 1928.

Broadway to American radio
When the popularity of the vaudeville showcase Playtime had become a real success, it attracted the attention of Broadway with Rain or Shine in early 1928.
Jessie had the idea for Playtime. Tom Howard was the writer. The routine they did placed their on-stage performance alongside Joe Cook, comedian. The Hamiltons and Fordyce were so well received that the Playtime showcase was recommended to run on its own merit.

The group's radio success started when the trio appeared in publicity photographs wearing eye masks, and capitalized on the new popularity of radio. Pearl needed to make a choice between investing in records, or concentrate on radio work. She chose to tour the US extensively, and sign with such sponsors as Ford, Chase and Sanborn, Best Foods, Tydol, Babbo, and others to pursue the radio career for her trio. A CBS Radio sponsor hired them, and they took a new stage name, "The Three X Sisters". In 1932, they were featured alongside other harmony trios in the November issue of Radio Digest Magazine. From October to December on the WABC-CBS radio program, you'd find this scenario, with the Three X Sisters at the 7:30pm time, followed by Connie Boswell at 7:45pm. They were also with ABC radio doing some cartoon scenario songs, appeared on the Eddie Cantor Show, harmonized the song "Those Eddie Cantor Eyes". Some radio transcribed tunes which they sang to identify the 1930s era in rhythm and the blues are "Old Clothes", "Good Times Coming", and "Still No Luck With You". Pearl's piano playing was crafted exclusively on their Musical Grocery Store radio tenure, alongside the Harry Salter Orchestra. By 1934 they were guests on The Nick Kenny Radio Hour and were performers/singers in part of the Nick Kenny (poet) scripted "Radio Scandals". They also introduced animation soundtrack songs over on-air radio broadcasts. They attributed voice-work for the popular Max Fleischer Cartoons synched with their early radio-work, and by 1933 they had a regular time-slot with NBC Radio. They continued on the airwaves until 1938, and were still popular at the Chicago Theater in Illinois, Palace Theater in NYC, and the Stanley Theater (now Benedum Center) in Pennsylvania on the same playbill as The Three Stooges. Entertainment news columnists found amusement in the name recognition.

Recordings and movie shorts in the 1930s
When a combined recording count is made, from 1927-1933 this trio had made 15 known professional song recordings (if song medleys are added then it's closer to 20). Most of those have been on records. This does not account for the Fleischer cartoon soundtracks. Additionally, their best known filmed song routine was completed with Paramount Pictures in 1935 with "Rex and His Soundeffects." Numerous transcribed recordings had been made on commercial 16 inch disks, or for hire by Tin Pan Alley recording studios onto 10" disks, years 1933-38; between 100-200, 3 song sets or medley's were transcribed, although, results of low cost recorded efforts which have damaged, deteriorated, and effected the recordings by age and time. Additional recordings in 1937, and 1940-42 exist on the NBC "Behind the Mike" program, Fleischer Studio soundtracks, and demo recordings. Modern day UK-based harmony trio, The Haywood Sisters, have recorded and perform "Rex and His Sound Effects" and are working on recording more of the Three X Sisters' music for modern audiences.

In 1932, the Three X Sisters were part of the CBS Tydol Jubilee Show and toured for a while with one of the hottest dance bands in the country, Paul Specht and His Orchestra, which was also popular with the college audience. In July they teamed up with Eddy Duchin and released at least one tune, "The Clouds Will Soon Roll By", as the Hamilton Sisters. In October of the same year, the sisters recorded several songs with the band of Isham Jones – another popular CBS artist – and two songs were recorded for RCA Victor. Jones experimented with arrangements that had an early Swing era bounce. The 1932 Victor- Isham Jones band segments were filmed in its unique character. Pearl, Vi, and Jessie decided to give up their weekends to do movie shorts. The Audition, 1932, featured a few acts, including the trio backed by the jazz guitarist Eddie Lang (heard but not seen in film). This is the same time frame that Annette Hanshaw had teamed with the jazz guitarist too. Lang guitar plucked his way along to "Here Comes The Showboat", as the trio sang, and it remained a popular short into 1933. Later in 1933, the trio was at the Coolidge memorial service - Washington Cathedral - "Three X Sisters" were part of the memorial service entertainment. Pearl started to use recording services at this time to preserve some of their radio performances. Teamed up with Mary Small on some of the "Little Miss Babo Surprise Party" in 1934. In 1935 the trio was teamed up with the Paramount Studio Orchestra which included another featured guitarist (with camera close-up's) on the Excuse My Gloves also known as Pardon My Glove movie short - the Three X Sisters sang amazingly to "Rex and His Sound Effects." It was reviewed with Ted Huseing, announcer, as one of the "outstanding" short features during the summer of 1935. The vocals and harmony are wonderful - the music sounds very Sweet and Swing era oriented.

Harmony trio broadcast over 1930s radio
The early 1930s saw the radio departures of the Boswell Sisters, Brox Sisters, and Pickens Sisters. During 1932, the Three X Sisters were top harmonizers on the radio. They had become Columbia networks' radio artists. During the summer/fall 1932, the " X Sisters" were signed with Tidewater and the Freddie Rich Orchestra for three times a week with CBS, and continued with Paul Specht on other nightly radio programs throughout that year. The trio signed their first "Artist Bureau" radio contract with N.B.C. Monday, February 13, was their first song assignment at 6:30 over the WJZ (AM) network.  A Competition was formed between the Three X Sisters and the Do-Re-Mi's, both the tops of their singing game in February 1933. Broadcasting management had the lady harmonists (individually) sing with musical accompaniment perform at different locations, and have it all brought together over a radio broadcast by the station radio swithchboard team. After the trio and Specht departed their Tidewater Oil Show (Tydol), they found a new nich with the Eddie Cantor Show (Chase and Sanborn Show) in 1933, as well as, in May with the Musical Grocery Store Program (Best Foods - sponsor for Hellman's Mayonnaise) were also doing harmonies with Tom Howard and the Rythmn Boys. They were one of a few guest spot singers on the Lum and Abner show during May-Dec1933. In 1934, they had many guest spot appearances alongside Mary Small on her Little Miss Bab-O Program (Babbitt Company—a detergent soap company).  On Sunday April 8, 1934 the trio shared the guest spot on the Bab-O show with Mario Cozzi, a New York baritone singer on WEAF. Cozzi recorded for Victor records, and had completed work at the New York Studio no. 2, in late February. Their harmonies continued and by 1935, they renewed their radio contract with NBC for 26 weeks. They were well known at the WJZ and WEAF (WNBC (AM)) microphone.

Radio had the Three X Sisters in a prominent spot as of 1933, and they were at the "Theatre Circuit" microphone at the Waldorf Astoria from 1933 to 1935. Eddie Duchin and Emil Coleman Orchestra's were at most of those events. Many Three X Sisters songs were featured during 1934, as well as in April and July during guest appearances on Little Miss Bab-O's Surprise Party with Mary Small and (William) Bill Wirges and His Orchestra.

In August 1934, the X's (were also Bab-O's guests) - then Mary Small, Jimmy Wallington, and other NBC personalities were performing at the Steel Pier in Atlantic City, NJ. In mid-February 1935, they were touring Chicago and broadcast over WJZ on Monday and Wednesday, until their arrival back in New York after March 2, as 1935 in music also proved to be a popular time for them. Made an appearance on the 'One Night Stand' broadcast on CBS singing a novelty "Three Little Pigs Are Porkchops Now." A big comedy inspired, radio audience appreciation song. Then an octet had been formed for the 'Rythmn Octette' program heard on WEAF-NBC at 7:30pm time slot. It paired the X Sisters, Three Scamps, Morton Gould and Bert Shefster, pianists, for Friday night broadcasts. Early November 1935, the trio headlined a big gala variety stage-show at the Hotel Astor. Despite the forever present 1930s great depression the trio got plenty of radio work. After only three weeks on the radio in America they were hired for movie shorts Radio Guide magazine ran a full page story about Mary Small, radio singer, and Small said about her singing career ... "There are three lovely ladies to whom I owe a great deal. They are Vi and Pearl Hamilton, and Jessie Fordyce, whom you hear on the radio as the Three X Sisters. It was they who heard me in Baltimore when I was eleven years old and really got me started." (October 5, 1935) Mary was a fan of the Three X Sisters before she became a radio singer.

Their radio popularity continued in 1936, while they shared the stage with the New Zeigfield Follies, Oliver Wakefield, monologist, as the Three X Sisters had also featured an advanced publisher's desk song the "Last Round Up", another of Billy Hill's popular tunes. In 1937, they remained well known in the songwriters' publishing world, especially that of Shapiro, and Bernstein Music Publishers on Broadway with Tin Pan Alley, sheet music from publishers had an appreciation for their NBC microphone. More radio recordings had been made of their song journey, and some with the Harry Smith Recording Studio in New York. Rumors about their radio departure reached the entertainment pages early in the year, however, not before the songbirds put together some of the best blues styled harmonies. They were sought for sheet-music songs but also for advanced song material for soundtracks from Hollywood movies. Some of these radio songs (mechanically transcribed onto 78 rpm recorded discs) were "It Looks Like Rain In Cherry Blossom Lane" and "Would You?" (on air advertisement for the motion picture, San Francisco). "We sell songs on the air...," quoted from Pearl, which affirmed the Three X Sisters radio notoriety.

Broadway styles changed
After their radio success in 1937, the trio started to record demo records with a variety of musicians. It might be considered the Pearl B. Santos All Star Band, during 1938 at the Columbia Recording Studio's. Although, a year or so later, Pearl had some members of the Dorsey Brothers Orchestra, and others in her band with Mary Small. It truly was a mystery band. Popular as ever in 1938, headliners at the Big Vaudeville houses at the Palace in NYC, Chicago Theater, Stanley in Philadelphia, and Buffalo, NY. After all of that, they left us with one WNEW radio recording of "Why'd You Make Me?" Pearl's songwriting authorship, and piano melodies (which had been heard on some radio programs for many years) had now peeked to their new medium. As well as, some public appearances with Henry Armetta and the Three Stooges. And continued with Fleisher Paramount Studio performances. In 1939, the Three X Sisters teamed up with such musical act's, in March with Rita Rio in a "new Swing Review", Gerald Griffin with a collaborative song "Jive Rumba", and by the end of the year, again with Mary Small. On September 29, 1940, over the NBC (Blue Network), Graham McNamee, on Behind the Mike, described to the Radio City Music Hall studio audience how "radio's most popular harmony trio" had discovered the singing talents of Mary Small. Pearl, Vi, and Jessie talk with Graham and Ed Wolf about Mary's wonderful voice. A Three X Sisters reunion took place January 26, 1941 on NBC radio with Graham McNamee on his Behind the Mike program (this can be listened to online), where it reintroduced their harmony singing. The group also introduced on this program an English version of the Latin-style song "Frenesi", which was their last recorded radio song appearance. In 1940, Pearl's written composition and Mary's singing collaborated on a '78 recorded demo of 'Smile American Smile.' In March 1941, the song was featured on the Morely's "On Page Two" script programs on local Brooklyn, New York WBBC and WEVD stations. Jessie also joined the cast of The 'Oneill's radio show, as Ginger Raymond.

Later, in 1943 or 1944, tweaking her composition, they attended some USO benefit concerts. Their harmony trio did some song jingles for the Carr Buscuit Co. in Pennsylvania.   Jessie became Cookie Carr, the character for the jingle; also sang duets (live on stage) with Artie Dunn, of the Three Suns. Individually, the " X Sisters" stepped out and performed solo engagements. Pearl and Mary Small performed at one event with Pearl's songwriting, piano, and big-band style arrangement, as Mary sang the song "Smile America Smile". Pearl then assembled shows which featured her penned compositions. In 2020, their Centennial Celebration of Songs had been underway, which featured the best of their harmony voices. Also, a re-recording effort of Pearl's original songs (on 33 LP Records) from the late 1930s-early 40s, and early 1950s.

Song list
 Chimes Of Merry Christmas (Pearl B. Santos and Violet W. Hamilton) 1940 Written by Pearl & Violet while they still performed with Jessie of the Three X Sisters. Rumor say's that the trio briefly sang this during the 1940's stage holiday show's. This 78 rpm home recording features Violet on vocals and chimes, Pearl on piano and backup harmony. Matilda Bovey, Pearl and Vi's mom, plays the harp. Online song release date Dec 20, 2021.
 Modern day tributes. "Rex and His Soundeffects" (aired Sept. 3, 2016 on station WERA 96.7FM at 7:30pm in Arlington,Virginia. Along with "Muddy Water", "Indian Rock and Roll", "Fond Recollections of Home", and others). 
 'The Little Girl With The Big Voice' documentary about Mary Small in 2015. The Haywood Sisters in 2013, and the Choo choo Sisters in 2014, tribute songs by the Three X Sisters harmony trio.
 "My Heart Stood Still" (R.Rodgers, L.Hart); June 1927; England.(Brunswick-105) Ambrose & His Mayfair Orch., vocals, Hamilton Sisters and Fordyce.
 "The Birth of the Blues" (DeSylva, Brown, Henderson); June 1927; England. (Brunswick-108) band and vocals - same as above.
 "One Summer Night" (Coslow, Spier); June 1927; England. (Brunswick-107) band and vocals - same as above.
 "Possibly"; June 1927; England. (Brunswick-107) band and vocals - same as above.
 "Someone to Watch Over Me"; (G. Gershwin). 1927; England. Savoy Orpheans. (HMV-B5322) vocals, Hamilton Sisters and Fordyce.
 "Blue Room" (R. Rodgers, L. Hart); 1927; England. Recorded. Savoy Orpheans. (HMV-B5322)vocals Hamilton Sisters and Fordyce.
 "One Summer Night" ;Savoy Orpheans (different version) (HMV-B5333). Recorded date same as above.
 "The Man I Love"; 1927; England, stage show. vocals, Hamilton Sisters and Fordyce.
 "Who, You That's Who?" (Yellen-Ager) (Columbia 4698); November 1927; England. piano, Billy Meryl; vocals, Hamilton Sisters and Fordyce.
 "Zulu Wail" (Skinner-Bibo) (Columbia 4698); November 1927; England. piano, Billy Meryl; vocals, Hamilton Sisters and Fordyce.
 "The Devil Is Afraid Of Music" (W.Robison) from UK Theatrical Production 'Blue Skies' 1927.
 "Here Comes the Showboat" (B.Rose, M.Pinkard);(Vitaphone-Warner Bros.); the Audition 1932; guitarist, Eddie Lang; vocals, Three X Sisters.
 "The Clouds Will Soon Roll By" (Woods, Brown) ; July 1, 1932; (Columbia 2680-D) Eddie Duchin & His Central Park Casino Orchestra. vocals, Hamilton Sisters.
 "Where, I Wonder, Where?" (Victor 24161)
 "What Would Happen to Me if Something Happened to You?" (Victor 24162) October 13, 1932. New York Studio No.1.(RCA Victor) Isham Jones & His Orch., vocals, Three X Sisters.
 "Shuffle Off to Buffalo"; June 16, 1933 (scripted lyrics from broadway 42nd Street Musical); Radio Transcript Recording; vocals, Three X Sisters.
 "Everybody Loves My Baby"; Oct.21,1932; CBS Radio log.
 "The Night When Love Was Born"; Oct.21,1932; CBS Radio log.
 "I Love To Sing At The Opera"; 1933; Radio Transcript Recording; vocals, Three X Sisters.
 "Scat Song"; 1933; Soundtrack 'Sing Sisters Sing' Paramount Pictures cartoon;vocals ".
 "If Mother's Could Live On Forever"; July 20, 1937 (NBC):Radio Transcript Recording (ARS).
 "Marcus Park Your Carcus Somewhere Else" (satirical spinoff of Dr. Marcus Parkus from the Rudy Valley Show): Radio Transcript Recording (ARS);(WEAF) July 20, 1937.
 "Old Clothes"; Radio Transcript Recording (ARS); (WEAF) July 20, 1937
 "Would You?"; 1937; Radio Transcript Recording (NBC). vocals Three X Sisters.
 "Why'd Ya' Make Me"; Aug. 20,1938 (WNEW).
 "It Looks Like Rain In Cherry Blossom Lane"; July 20, 1937 (NBC); Radio Transcript Recording (ARS).
 "Sing and Be Happy"; Aug. 17, 1937; Radio Transcript Recording.
 "So Many Memories" (R.Rodgers, L.Hart); July 20, 1937; Radio Transcript Recording (included with Yours and Mine).
 "This Is My Last Affair" (H.Johnson); July 20, 1937; Radio Transcript Recording (NBC) (included with "Yours and Mine") vocals, Violet Wanita Hamilton
 "Yours and Mine"; July 20, 1937 (NBC); Radio Transcript Recording (ARS).
 "You Can't Brush Me Off" (Irving Berlin); Recorded demo 1940.vocals, Violet Wanita Hamilton.
 "Tiger Rag"; Radio Transcript Recording.
 Good Times Coming; Radio Transcript Recording.
 "Frenesi" (Alberto Dominguez): (English words by Ray Charles and S.K. Russell) (NBC-Behind the Mike); Jan. 26, 1941; Radio Transcript Recording. vocals, Three X Sisters.
 "Maybe, I Lost Your Love? By Lovin' You So"; 1946 (Shapiro & Bernstein, publishers); Introduced by Russ Morgan and His Orchestra. Recorded demo by the Hamilton Sisters (Pearl and Vi)Dec. 11,1945.
 "Muddy Water"; Recorded demo 1937. vocals, Violet Wanita Hamilton.

Cartoon songs
 "Barnacle Bill The Sailor"; Three X Sisters with Paul Specht & His Orchestra (WABC); November 18, 1932.
 "Betty Boop" (John Green, Edward Heyman). Famous Music Corporation. (WABC); November 1932.
 "Poor Robinson Caruso"; Harry Smith Recording Service, NYC; (WEAF) April 5, 1937. Musicians, Luz Brothers. vocals, Three X Sisters.
 "Rex and His Soundeffects"; Paramount Pictures 'Excuse My Gloves' (also known as 'Pardon My Glove') 1935;vocals, Three X Sisters.

Notable songs
 "A-Tisket, A-Tasket", "You Too Can Be The Life Of The Party", Alexander's Ragtime Band; performed live at the Hippodrome, Baltimore, Maryland October 30, 1938.
 "Bye, Bye Baby" (R. King); (WEAF) July 20, 1937; Radio Recording Service (ARS).
 "Throwing Stones At The Sun"
 "The Old Spinning Wheel"
 "I'm An Old Cowhand"
 "Colorado Moon"
 "Please, Mr. President" (WEAF);June 16, 1933.
 "Sweet Georgia Brown"
 "Mardi Gras", "Song of the Islands", "Mississippi Mud"; radio performance with Paul Specht & Orchestra, 7:30pm (WABC) November 18, 1932.
 "Who's Afraid of the Big Bad Wolf?" 1934 (Paramount Pictures) sang in conjunction  with 'Radio Roundup' , part of the movie 'Six Of A Kind'

References

Further reading
 Calvin Coolidge memorial, 1933; Robert Trout's papers.
 Popular Songs Magazine; 'X Marks the Spot'. BBC, England. Leslie Green, May 1935.
 Cumberland Young Ladies Successful On The London Stage. Cumberland Daily News. Cumberland, Maryland. Sept. 28, 1927.
 Fleischer Story, Leslie Cabarga: Books. Museum of Television and Radio; NBC and WJZ radio broadcasts, 1933, 1934, 1941.
 New York Times newspaper: Radio Listings (various) 1932–1938.
 Moanin' Low: A Discography of Female Popular Vocal Recordings, 1920–1933 (Discographies) (9780313292415): Ross Laird: Books.
 Singing Sisters
 Radio Guide; They Wouldn't Believe Me (Mary Small); Wed. Oct. 5, 1935.

External links

 Myspace.com
 Three X Sisters website on Angelfire

American girl groups
American pop music groups
American radio personalities
American vocal groups
Musical groups established in 1922
Musical groups disestablished in 1946
Vaudeville performers